Nathalie María Viteri Jimenez (born 6 October 1974) is a lawyer and an Ecuadorian Assemblyperson. In 2021 she joined the fourth legislative period of the National Assembly.

Life
Viteri was born on 6 October 1974. Her parents are José Viteri Peña and Leonor Jiménez Campuzano, and her elder sister is Cynthia Viteri.

She worked in the mayor's office, and she served as an alternate councilor for Doménica Tabacchi, who became the vice mayor of Guayaquil.

In March 2007, the Supreme Electoral Court dismissed 57 deputies from the National Assembly. Viteri was one of these politicians. The deputies appealed against the decision twice, and they were successful. However, their places were no longer available.

However, Viteri was again elected to the National Assembly in 2021. Viteri is from Guayaquil where her sister, Cynthia Viteri, is the mayor. 

In November 2021, she was one of the 81 politicians who abstained from voting, which allowed the Economic Development and Fiscal Sustainability Law to be passed. Other abstainers included Jessica Castillo, Rosa Cerda, Ana Herrera, Gissella Molina and Patricia Sánchez.

In 2022, during a debate, she spoke of sodium chloride being used to cause an abortion. This does not happen according to the World Health Organisation. Viteri makes a high number of interventions in the assembly. On average, members of the assembly made about ten interventions each during the first ten months of the new session's plenaries. However, Viteri made over 40, putting her in the top five for interventions up to March 2022.

Private life 
Viteri is married to Oscar Crow; they have two children.

References

1974 births
Living people
People from Guayaquil
21st-century Ecuadorian women politicians
21st-century Ecuadorian politicians
Members of the National Assembly (Ecuador)
Women members of the National Assembly (Ecuador)